V29 may refer to:
 Fokker V.29, a German World War I fighter aircraft prototype
 SMS V29, a German World War I torpedo boat sunk during the Battle of Jutland
 V.29, a telecommunications recommendation of the ITU-T